"All She Wants to Do Is Dance" is a song written by Danny Kortchmar and performed by Don Henley, co-lead vocalist and drummer for Eagles. It was released as the second single from Henley's second studio solo album, Building the Perfect Beast (1984), and was Henley's sixth solo single overall. It was one of Henley's most commercially successful singles, peaking at No. 9 on Billboard Hot 100 and also became his third song to top the Top Rock Tracks chart.

History
The song critiques the US intervention in Central America, particularly in the then-ongoing Contra War, in which the Reagan administration funded the right-wing rebel group Contras to overthrow the socialist Sandinista National Liberation Front government in Nicaragua.

Backing vocals for the song was provided by Patty Smyth of the band Scandal, and Martha Davis, lead singer of the Motels.

When Kortchmar was asked about the song, he said, "I had the groove and the music going. That record was made back when the technology had just started to really take over in music. I had one of the first Yamaha DX7s, which was a keyboard that was used a ton in the '80s, but we ended up luckily getting one of the first ones in the United States. It's a synthesizer keyboard, and I used it to get that sound that you hear the record starting with."

The commercial U.S. 7" vinyl version has a slightly different intro than the LP version from Building the Perfect Beast.

Critical reception
John Leland from Spin magazine wrote about the 12" single version of the song saying "...this mother whomps from the git with punchy electronic drums and a mix that keeps one foot off the ground for a full seven-and-a-half minutes. Henley's post-hedonist vision of apocalypse is twisted."

Personnel

 Don Henley – lead and harmony vocals, drums
 David Paich – synthesizers
 Steve Porcaro – programming
 Danny Kortchmar – guitars
 Martha Davis – harmony vocals
 Patty Smyth – harmony vocals

Chart performance

Other versions
The single "All She Wanna Do Is Dance" by David Guetta and Niles Mason uses samples of this song.

See also
 List of number-one mainstream rock hits (United States)
 Ronald Reagan in music

References

External links
 

1985 singles
Don Henley songs
Songs written by Danny Kortchmar
1984 songs
Geffen Records singles
Songs about dancing
Song recordings produced by Danny Kortchmar
Ronald Reagan